T cell receptor gamma variable 9, also known as TRGV9, is a human gene.

References

Further reading 

 
 
 
 
 
 
 
 

Human genes